Nehru Arts and Science College also known as Nehru College, Kanhangad, is a post-graduate and graduate college in Kanhangad affiliated to the Kannur University.

Affiliation
The college is affiliated to Kannur University

References

Colleges affiliated to Kannur University
Colleges in Kasaragod district